Ilanga ptykte is a species of sea snail, a marine gastropod mollusk in the family Solariellidae.

Description
The size of the shell attains 5.2 mm.

Distribution
This marine species occurs off Indonesia.

References

 Vilvens C. (2009). New species and new records of Solariellidae (Gastropoda: Trochoidea) from Indonesia and Taiwan. Novapex 10(3): 69-96

External links
 MNHN: photo of a shell of Archiminolia ptykte
 Williams, S.T., Kano, Y., Warén, A. & Herbert, D.G. (2020). Marrying molecules and morphology: first steps towards a reevaluation of solariellid genera (Gastropoda: Trochoidea) in the light of molecular phylogenetic studies. Journal of Molluscan Studies 86 (1): 1–26

ptykte
Gastropods described in 2009